Villa Unión may refer to:
 Villa Unión (Argentina)
 Villa Unión, Coahuila (Mexico)
 Villa Unión, Sinaloa (Mexico)